The 24th Legislative Assembly of Ontario was in session from November 22, 1951, until May 2, 1955, just prior to the 1955 general election. The majority party was the Ontario Progressive Conservative Party led by Leslie Frost.

M.C. Davies served as speaker for the assembly.

Members elected to the Assembly

Timeline

External links 
Members in Parliament 24

References 

Terms of the Legislative Assembly of Ontario
1951 establishments in Ontario
1955 disestablishments in Ontario